Miss Yugoslavia (named Miss Serbia and Montenegro between 2003 and 2006) was the national beauty pageant of Yugoslavia, held since 1927 in Kingdom of Yugoslavia up to the breakup of Serbia and Montenegro (FR Yugoslavia) in 2006. It was organized by the company "Miss YU". In 2006, independent Montenegro and Serbia began hosting separate pageants, Miss Montenegro and Miss Serbia, respectively.

History
Miss Yugoslavia held for the first time in 1927. The main winner represented the country at Miss Europe beauty pageant. The Miss YU also registered to send title holders to Miss Universe, Miss World, Miss International and Miss Earth pageants. In 2003 the Miss YU renamed as Miss Serbia and Montenegro. A winner represented Serbia and Montenegro at Miss Universe and Miss World.

Titleholders

Miss Yugoslavia

Miss Serbia and Montenegro

Major International competitions
Color key

Miss Universe

Miss World
The participation of Serbia at Miss World from Yugoslavia

Miss International
The participation of Serbia at Miss International from Yugoslavia

Miss Earth

External links
Miss Serbia: Official Site

References

Beauty pageants in Serbia
Beauty pageants in Montenegro
Recurring events disestablished in 2006
Recurring events established in 1991
2006 disestablishments in Serbia and Montenegro
1991 establishments in Yugoslavia
Yugoslav awards
Serbia and Montenegro awards